The National Unity Consultative Council (NUCC) is an advisory body of the National Unity Government of Myanmar. Formed in response to the 2021 Myanmar coup d'etat, the NUCC seeks to overthrow the military dictatorship and build a federal democratic union in Myanmar through collective leadership, political dialogue, and coordination. NUCC is a historic alliance of ethnic armed organizations and the Bamar majority, and is considered one of the most inclusive in modern Burmese history.

History 
28 political institutions, including the Committee Representing Pyidaungsu Hluttaw (CRPH), Ethnic Armed Organizations (EAOs), federal-unit and nationalities-based consultative councils formed the NUCC on 8 March 2021. NUCC published a two-part Federal Democratic Charter on 31 March 2021 as a precursor to replace the military-drafted 2008 Constitution of Myanmar, which was abolished by CRPH that same day. On 16 April 2021, it formed the National Unity Government (NUG).

In May and September 2022, the government of Malaysia, an ASEAN member-state, called for ASEAN to formally engage with NUCC and NUG in the face of intransigence from Myanmar's ruling military junta. In December 2022, the American government passed the BURMA Act, which explicitly expresses the government's support of and authorises assistance to NUCC, NUG, and other pro-democracy advocates aiming to restore civilian rule. In response, the military junta issued a statement dubbing the law an interference in Myanmar's internal affairs, and encroachment of the country's sovereignty.

Representatives 
NUCC representatives include the Committee Representing Pyidaungsu Hluttaw (CRPH), a legislative body representing deposed lawmakers elected by the 2020 Myanmar general election, eight ethnic armed organizations, including the Karen National Union (KNU), the Karenni National Progressive Party (KNPP), and the Chin National Front (CNF), and five ethnic-based consultative councils representing the Kachin, Chin, Karenni, Mon, and Palaung peoples. Ethnic-based political parties, civil society organizations and civil disobedience groups were also founding members.

See also 

 2021 Myanmar coup d'etat
 National Unity Government
 State Administration Council

References

External links 

 

2021 establishments in Myanmar
Governments in exile
Democratization
Internal conflict in Myanmar